Robledillo de la Jara is a municipality of the Community of Madrid, Spain. It has an area of 20.35 km ² with a population of 130 people and a density of 6.39 inhabitants per km ².

References

Municipalities in the Community of Madrid